The 1980–81 Utah Utes men's basketball team represented the University of Utah in the 1980-81 season. Head coach Jerry Pimm, and Senior stars Tom Chambers and Danny Vranes would lead the Utes to a Western Athletic Conference championship and the Sweet Sixteen of the NCAA tournament. In the best season the Utes would have under Pimm, the team finished with an overall record of 25–5 (13–3 WAC). Vranes and Chambers were both selected in the top 8 picks of the NBA Draft. Chambers, drafted by the San Diego (Now Los Angeles) Clippers, would go on to play for several NBA teams in his career, most notably the Phoenix Suns, with whom he would make an appearance in the 1993 NBA Finals; and the Utah Jazz.

Roster

Schedule and results

|-
!colspan=9 style=| Regular season

|-
!colspan=9 style=| NCAA tournament

NCAA tournament

3/15/1981, second round Vs. Northeastern @ Don Haskins Center, El Paso, TX - W, 94-69
3/19/1981, Sweet Sixteen Vs. North Carolina @ Special Events Center, Salt Lake City, UT - L, 56-61

Rankings

NBA Draft

References

Utah Utes men's basketball seasons
Utah
Utah
Utah Utes
Utah Utes